Harry Robinson may refer to:

Harry Robinson (rugby union) (born 1993), Welsh rugby union player
Harry Robertson (musician) (1932–1996), British musician, bandleader, music director and composer, aka Harry Robinson
Harry Orman Robinson (1872–1933), American football coach
Harry Robinson (RAF officer) (1898–1926), World War I flying ace
Harry G. Robinson III (born 1942), African American architect and professor of architecture
Harry Robinson (darts player) (born 1969), English darts player
Harry Robinson (footballer) (born 2000), Northern Irish footballer

See also
Henry Robinson (disambiguation)
Harold Robinson (disambiguation)